La Course, LaCourse, or Lacourse is a surname. Notable people with this surname include:
Bob Lacourse (1925–2013), Canadian cyclist
Danielle Lacourse, Miss Rhode Island USA 2007 
Joanne LaCourse, American laser scientist
Michelle LaCourse, American viola player